The rock art of the Figuig region of Morocco consists of prehistoric engravings, which date to the Neolithic period. The petroglyphs belong to the wider south Algerian group, Sud-oranais (South Oranian). They are located east of the rock art and cave paintings of the Atlas Mountains. Comparable rock engravings have been described more to the east in the surroundings of Djelfa and in Constantine, Algeria.

References

See also
List of Stone Age art
Draa River

Figuig
Prehistoric art
History of the Sahara
Neolithic
Moroccan art